Martha Angélica Tagle Martínez (born 26 November 1973) is a Mexican politician from the Citizens' Movement. From 2006 to 2009 she served as Deputy of the LX Legislature of the Mexican Congress representing the Federal District.

References

1973 births
Living people
Politicians from Mexico City
Women members of the Chamber of Deputies (Mexico)
Citizens' Movement (Mexico) politicians
21st-century Mexican politicians
21st-century Mexican women politicians
Deputies of the LX Legislature of Mexico
Members of the Chamber of Deputies (Mexico) for Mexico City
Members of the Senate of the Republic (Mexico) for Mexico City
Women members of the Senate of the Republic (Mexico)